The Coastal Bend Aviators were a minor league baseball team which played in Robstown, Texas, in the United States from 2003 to 2007.  They were a member of the Central Baseball League, then the American Association and were not affiliated with any Major League Baseball team.

The team played at Aviators Stadium.

References
 aabfan.com - yearly league standings & awards

External links
aabfan.com Coastal Bend Aviators Guide

Defunct American Association of Professional Baseball teams
Defunct baseball teams in Texas
2003 establishments in Texas
Baseball teams established in 2003
2007 disestablishments in Texas
Baseball teams disestablished in 2007
Nueces County, Texas
Professional baseball teams in Texas
Defunct independent baseball league teams